Homenetmen Bourj Hamoud is a Lebanese multi-sports club, mostly known for its basketball program. Established in 1935, it is located in Bourj Hamoud, Matn District, Lebanon, and is part of Homenetmen Lebanon.

The women's basketball team is part of the Lebanese Basketball League. It finished last in the 2008–09 season. and 7th in 2009–10 season.

See also
Homenetmen Lebanon
Homenetmen Antelias
Homenetmen Beirut
Homenetmen Beirut (football)
Homenetmen Beirut (basketball)

References

External links
Homenetmen Bourj Hamoud (Women) Asia-Basket page

Basketball teams in Lebanon
Diaspora sports clubs
Homenetmen Lebanon